The Taoyuan Refinery is an oil refinery in Guishan District, Taoyuan City, Taiwan.

History
The refinery was established in 1976. In 2008, a gasoline pyrolysis and hydro-desulfurization unit was constructed at the refinery with a capacity of 30,000 barrels per day.

Technical specifications
The refinery has a capacity to process 200,000 barrel of crude oil per day.

See also
 List of oil refineries
 Mining in Taiwan

References

1976 establishments in Taiwan
Buildings and structures in Taoyuan City
Energy infrastructure completed in 1976
Oil refineries in Taiwan